ICT Express is a peer-reviewed scientific journal of Information and Communications Technology established in 2015. It is published four times a year by Elsevier on behalf of The Korean Institute of Communications Information Sciences. The journal is edited by Eun-Soo Kim.

Indexing and abstracting
The journal is abstracted and indexed in the following bibliographic databases:
Korea Citation Index (KCI)
Scopus
Emerging Sources Citation Index (ESCI)
Science Citation Index Expanded (SCIE)
Directory of Open Access Journals (DOAJ)
INSPEC
Google Scholar
Ei Compendex
According to  Scopus, the journal has a 2019 CiteScore of 5.9.

External links
Official website

References

Publications established in 2015
English-language journals
Computer science journals
Elsevier academic journals